James R. Barkley (February 13, 1869 – July 26, 1948) was an American politician from the state of Iowa.

Barkley was born in Davis County, Iowa in 1869. He served as a Republican in the Iowa Senate from January 8, 1945, until his death in Moulton on July 26, 1948. He was interred in Oakland Cemetery in Moulton, Iowa.

References

1869 births
1948 deaths
Republican Party Iowa state senators